Mitochondrial import inner membrane translocase subunit Tim10 is an enzyme that in humans is encoded by the TIMM10 gene.

TIMM10 belongs to a family of evolutionarily conserved proteins that are organized in heterooligomeric complexes in the mitochondrial intermembrane space. These proteins mediate the import and insertion of hydrophobic membrane proteins into the mitochondrial inner membrane.[supplied by OMIM]

References

Further reading